The Denmark League XI national football team is an unofficial national football team run by the Danish Football Association.

The team generally consists of Danish players playing in the Danish Superliga, or other leagues if their clubs agree to release them. It is only assembled in the start of the year, during the winter break in the Superliga.

The matches of the League XI have generally not been recognised as official matches by the Danish FA, although FIFA recognised matches until 2007.

History

A Danish Football Combination played the Scottish League XI in 1955. Since 1983, the team has been assembled every year except 2005 (because of an early World Cup qualification match) and 2011 (where no suitable trip could be arranged) in January or February.

The League XI national team has played 84 matches throughout its existence, of which 51 were played in 1983-1999 and 33 in 2000-2018. No additional matches were played in 2019-2022.

Players
The purpose of the league XI is to give the head coach an opportunity to evaluate the level of the best players of the Superliga, and to introduce new players into the atmosphere of the national team.

Friendlies

Since January 1983, the League XI national team has played 84 matches throughout its existence, of which 51 were played in 1983-1999 and 33 in 2000-2018. No additional matches were played in 2019-2022.

Squad

References

External links
 The League XI national team 2010 at the Danish FA

Denmark national football team
Representative teams of association football leagues